Heneage Finch may refer to (in chronological order): 

 Sir Heneage Finch (speaker) (1580–1631), Speaker of the House of Commons 1625–1626
 Heneage Finch, 1st Earl of Nottingham (1621–1682), son of Sir Heneage Finch
 Heneage Finch, 3rd Earl of Winchilsea (1628–1689) 
 Heneage Finch, 1st Earl of Aylesford (c. 1649–1719), English statesman and lawyer
 Heneage Finch, 5th Earl of Winchilsea (1657–1726) 
 Heneage Finch, 2nd Earl of Aylesford (1683–1757), British peer and member of the House of Lords
 Heneage Finch, 3rd Earl of Aylesford (1715–1777), British Member of Parliament for Maidstone and Leicestershire
 Heneage Finch, 4th Earl of Aylesford (1751–1812), artist and politician
 Heneage Finch, 5th Earl of Aylesford (1786–1859),  High Steward of Sutton Coldfield
 Heneage Finch (surveyor) (1793–1850), grandson of the 3rd Earl of Aylesford and namesake of Finch County, New South Wales
 Heneage Finch, 6th Earl of Aylesford (1824–1871), politician and amateur cricketer
 Heneage Finch, 7th Earl of Aylesford (1849–1885)

See also
 Finch (surname)